Pridvorica (in Serbian Cyrillic ) is a village in Serbia on the banks of the Studenica River, in the municipality of Kraljevo and the district of Raška.

External links 
 Satellite view of Pridvorica

Populated places in Raška District